A dithiane is a heterocyclic compound composed of a cyclohexane core structure wherein two methylene bridges (-- units) are replaced by sulfur centres. The three isomeric parent heterocycles are 1,2-dithiane, 1,3-dithiane and 1,4-dithiane.

1,3-Dithianes

1,3-Dithianes are protecting group of some carbonyl-containing compounds due to their inertness to many conditions.  They form by treatment of the carbonyl compound with 1,3-propanedithiol under conditions that remove water from the system.  The protecting group can be removed with mercuric reagents, a process that exploits the high affinity of Hg(II) for thiolates. 1,3-Dithianes are also employed in umpolung reactions, such as the Corey–Seebach reaction: 

Typically, in organic synthesis, ketones and aldehydes are protected as their dioxolanes instead of dithianes.

References

External links 
 Corey-Seebach Reaction
 1,3-Dithianes, 1,3-Dithiolanes